Phaseolus (bean, wild bean) is a genus of herbaceous to woody annual and perennial vines in the family Fabaceae containing about 70 plant species, all native to the Americas, primarily Mesoamerica.

It is one of the most economically important legume genera. Five of the species have been domesticated since pre-Columbian times for their beans: P. acutifolius (tepary bean), P. coccineus (runner bean), P. dumosus (year bean), P. lunatus (lima bean), and P. vulgaris (common bean). Most prominent among these is the common bean, P. vulgaris, which today is cultivated worldwide in tropical, semitropical, and temperate climates.

Ecology 
Phaseolus species are used as food plants by the larvae of some Lepidoptera species, including common swift, garden dart, ghost moth Hypercompe albicornis, H. icasia and the nutmeg.

Etymology

The generic name Phaseolus was introduced by Linnaeus in 1753, from the Latin phaseolus, a diminutive of phasēlus, in turn borrowed from Greek φάσηλος 'cowpea', of unknown origin. The Latin word phaseolus is often incorrectly glossed as 'kidney bean', a New World crop.

Taxonomy 
Previous classifications placed a number of other well-known legume species in this genus, but they were subsequently reassigned to the genus Vigna, sometimes necessitating a change of species name. For example, older literature refers to the mung bean as Phaseolus aureus, whereas more modern sources classify it as Vigna radiata. Similarly, the snail bean Vigna caracalla  was discovered in 1753 and in 1970 moved from Phaseolus to Vigna. The modern understanding of Phaseolus indicates a genus endemic only to the New World.

Species

Species have been organized into eight groups based on phylogenetic clades:

Filiformis group
Phaseolus angustissimus A. Gray
Phaseolus filiformis—slimjim bean
Phaseolus carterae
Leptostachyus group
Phaseolus leptostachyus
Phaseolus macvaughii
Phaseolus micranthus
Lunatus group
Phaseolus augusti
Phaseolus bolivianus
Phaseolus lunatus—lima bean, butter bean
Phaseolus pachyrrhizoides
Phaseolus viridis
Phaseolus mollis
Pauciflorus group
Phaseolus pauciflorus
Phaseolus parvulus
Phaseolus perplexus
Phaseolus pluriflorus
Phaseolus tenellus
Pedicellatus group
Phaseolus altimontanus
Phaseolus dasycarpus
Phaseolus esperanzae
Phaseolus grayanus
Phaseolus laxiflorus
Phaseolus neglectus
Phaseolus pedicellatus
Phaseolus texensis
Polystachios group
Phaseolus albinervus
Phaseolus jaliscanus
Phaseolus juquilensis
Phaseolus maculatus—spotted bean
Phaseolus marechalii
Phaseolus polystachios
Phaseolus reticulatus
Phaseolus ritensis
Phaseolus smilacifolius
Tuerckheimii group
Phaseolus chiapasanus
Phaseolus gladiolatus
Phaseolus hintonii
Phaseolus oligospermus
Phaseolus tuerckheimii
Phaseolus xanthrotrichus
Phaseolus zimapanensis
Vulgaris group
Phaseolus acutifolius—tepary bean
Phaseolus albescens
Phaseolus coccineus—runner bean
Phaseolus costaricensis
Phaseolus dumosus—year bean 
Phaseolus parvifolius
Phaseolus persistentus
Phaseolus vulgaris—common bean, French bean, black bean, kidney bean, pinto bean, green bean
Uncategorized
Phaseolus amblyosepalus
Phaseolus anisotrichos
Phaseolus brevicalyx
Phaseolus chacoensis
Phaseolus cibellii
Phaseolus galactoides
Phaseolus glabellus
Phaseolus leucanthus
Phaseolus macrolepis
Phaseolus massaiensis
Phaseolus microcarpus
Phaseolus nelsonii
Phaseolus oaxacanus
Phaseolus plagiocylix
Phaseolus polymorphus
Phaseolus sonorensis
Phaseolus vulcanicus

Allergenicity
The Phaseolus plant has an OPALS plant allergy scale rating of 4 out of 10, indicating moderate potential to cause allergic reactions, exacerbated by over-use of the same plant throughout a garden. Leaves can cause skin rash and old plants often carry Rust (fungus).

References

 
Fabaceae genera
Phaseoleae
Taxa named by Carl Linnaeus